Óscar Moreno (Porto, November 16, 1878 - Porto, May 26, 1971), was a Portuguese urologist, doctor, scientist and chemist.

Early life
Moreno was born in Porto, in the parish of Victoria, the son of Jose Lourenço Russo, and Lucinda de Sousa Martins Ribeiro.  His uncle (on his mother's side) was Dr. Rodrigo de Sousa Moreno, doctor of the medical school of Porto and administrator of the county of Gondomar.

Studies
Influenced by his uncle, he started his medical studies in the School of Medicine and Surgery of Porto. On completing the course of medicine in 1908 as a student of Roberto Frias, he attended the Medical School of Paris (Necker Hospital) as a student of Marie Curie.  There he specialized in urology, completing his doctorate in medicine in the year of 1911.  His thesis "About Kidney Functions" received the best classification.

Career
Moreno was monitor of the Urinary service in the Medical School of Paris (Necker Hospital) from 1908 to 1911. He was also hired to be Professor of Urology at the School of Medicine of Porto, from 1917 to 1948, the first professor to occupy that position in the School of Medicine of Porto. He founded and directed the Department of Urology in the General Hospital of Santo António (1924), originally called the Department of Urology and Venerology.

Moreno devoted his work in particular to the exploitation of functional kidneys, and contributed to the discovery of "Ambard constant," also called the "Ambard-Moreno constant," which is used to assess the state of operation of the kidney.

He died in Porto, in the parish of Victoria.

Scientific papers 
Moreno published numerous scientific papers, published in Portugal and abroad:

"Volume et des urines maximum concentration. Signification diagnosed de la pyurie", in collaboration with Heitz Boyer, Médicale Presse, March 29, 1911;
"Des injections de pâte bismuthée en chirurgie urinaire", in collaboration with Heitz Boyer, Anal. des evil. des voies urinaires, 11, 1910;
"Comparaison du fonctionnement rénal avant et après la néphrectomie", in collaboration with Chevassu, Revue de Gynécologie, 1911.

Bibliography 

Portuguese Bibliography

Anuário académico - Academia das ciências de Lisboa ; Academia das Ciências de Lisboa 1943, Página 230

Bueno, Francisco da Silveira, Grande dicionário etimológico-prosódico da língua portuguêsa, 1963

Carvalho, F. Pinto, Contribuiçâo para a Historia da Urologia em Portugal, Imprensa Nacional-Casa da Moeda, Lisboa 2003

Grande Enciclopédia Portuguesa Brasileira; vol 17 página 877

Macedo, Manuel Machado; História da Medicina em Portugal no século XX; CTT Correios, Lisboa 1998, página 113

Quem é alguém: Who's who in Portugal 1947, Página 41

French Bibliography

Annales de physiologie et de physicochimie biologique - Página 656 - 1936

Journal médical français - Página 444 -1919

Journal de chirurgie - Página 199, 645 por Pierre-Joseph Desault – 1936

Travaux annuels de l'Hôpital d'urologie et de chirurgie urinaire ... 1920 - Página 224
por Hôpital d'urologie et de chirurgie urinaire (Paris, France). - 1920

Journal de pharmacie et de chimie - Página 38 por Société de pharmacie de Paris - 1922
	
Journal de pharmacie et de chimie - Página 38 por Société de pharmacie de Paris - 1942

Revue belge des sciences medicales - Página 625 por Albert Lemaire, Société de médecine de Gand, Société scientifique de Bruxelles. Section médicale - 1936

Archives provinciales de chirurgie - Página 148, 1913
Annales de la Société scientifique de Bruxelles - Página 61 por Société scientifique de Bruxelles - 1929

Mémoires de la Société royale des sciences de Liège - Página 5, por Société royale des sciences de Liège - 1957

Journal de physiologie, por Association des physiologistes (France) - 1926, Página 633
	
Congrès français de médecine. v.1, 1911

Bulletin des sciences pharmacologiques - Página 549, 1911

Annales des maladies des organes génito-urinaires - Página 28, 1911

Catalogue général des livres imprimés de la Bibliothèque nationale, pela Bibliothèque nationale (France). Département des imprimés, Léopold Delisle, France Ministère de l'instruction publique, Paris (France) Ministère de l'éducation nationale - 1933
Página 520

Revue sud-américaine de médecine et de chirurgie - Página 651, 1934

Biologie médicale: revue bimestrielle des sciences biologique considerée - Página 160, 1913

Revista de medicina y cirugia practicas - Página 60, 1919

Le Rôle de l'urée en pathologie - Página 24, por Ch Achard, Charles Achard - 1912

Acta Urologica Belgica - Página 738, pela Société belge d'urologie – 1946
	
Bibliographia Physiologica por Concilium Bibliographicum, Zürich - 1912, Página 252

Comptes rendus des séances de la Société de biologie et de ses filiales - Página 74 pela Société de biologie et de ses filiales, Société de biologie, Paris, Société de biologie (Paris, France). – 1916

Physiologie normale et pathologique des reins - Página 90 por Léon Ambard - 1931

Precis de pathologie chirurgicale. v.4, 1920-21 - Página 8
1921

English Bibliography

Chemical Abstracts, de American Chemical Society, American Chemical Society Chemical Abstracts Service - 1990
	
Journal of the American Medical Association, por American Medical Association - 1912, Página 230

American journal of diseases of children - Página 362 por American Medical Association - 1911

American journal of diseases of children - Página 26  por American Medical Association - 1913

Index catalogue of the library of the surgeon-general's office, United States Army - Library of the Surgeon-General's Office (U.S.)- Edição de U.S.G.P.O., 1914

Surgery, gynecology & obstetrics, por Franklin H. Martin Memorial Foundation, American College of Surgeons - 1917

Practice of Medicine - Página 277, por Frederick Tice – 1922

Functional diagnosis - Página 306, por Max Kahn - 1920

German Bibliography

Berichte ueber die gesamte physiologie und experimentelle - Página 518, 1920

Zeitschrift für urologische chirurgie und gynaekologische urologie - Página 158,1917

Biochemische Zeitschrift - Página 365, 1913

Index zum Diabetes mellitus: eine internationale Bibliographie - Página 717
por Joseph Schumacher - 1961

Jahresbericht über die Fortschritte auf dem Gebiete der Chirurgie - Página 850
editado por Otto Hildebrand – 1914

Biochemische Zeitschrift - Página 200, 1921

Folia urologica: Internationales Archiv für die Krankheiten der Harnorgane - Página 180
por Gustav Kulisch - 1918

Zentralblatt der experimentellen Medizin (experimentelle Pathologie und ...
1912, Página 276

Urologischer Jahresbericht - Página 56, 1913

Frommel, Richard - Jahresbericht über die Fortschritt auf dem Gebiete der Geburtshilfe und Gynäkologie, edição de J.F. Bergmann, 1928 - Página 307

Zentralblatt für Gynaekologie - Página 453, 1915

Zentralblatt für chirurgie - Página 825, 1911

Zeitschrift für urologie - Página 875, 1914

Zeitschrift für experimentelle pathologie und therapie - Página 272, 1914

Jahresbericht Geburtshilfe und Gynaekologie - Página 307, 1912

Kliniske Studier over Nyrefunktionen hos Nephrectomerede - Página 32
por Erling Andreas Schroeder - 1944

Bibliographie der fremdsprachigen Zeitschriftenliteratur, 1937, Página 218

Spanish Bibliography

Revista española de Medicina y cirugia - editado por Ramón Torres Casanovas – 1919, Página 283
	
González, Agustín Mateo - Eclampsia puerperal - 1916, Página 84

Italian Bibliography

Archivio italiano di urologia e nefrologia, 1926 - Página 205

Policlinico: sezione chirurgica - Página 174

Clinica chirurgica - Istituto di patologica chirurgica, Rome 1928 - Página 732

Revista Stiintelor Medicale, 1928 - Página 299

Russian Bibliography

Bolʹshai︠a︡ medit︠s︡inskai︠a︡ ėnt︠s︡iklopedii︠a︡:Glav  - Página 886
por Aleksandr Nikolaevich Bakulev - 1956

External links 
 http://www.hgsa.pt/servicos.php?id=14
 http://www.apurologia.pt/urologiaemport1.htm
 http://www.apurologia.pt/urologiaemport3.htm
 http://www.geneall.net/P/per_page.php?id=1046611

Portuguese urologists
1878 births
1971 deaths
People from Porto
20th-century Portuguese physicians
19th-century Portuguese physicians